The Auchter Company was established in 1929 in Jacksonville, Florida by George D. Auchter. The company was among Florida's oldest general construction contractors and built many of Jacksonville's civil and corporate buildings, including the City Hall. and ranked among the top design/build firms in the US.  The Auchter Company also helped build ships needed for World War II, as part of the  US Navy's Emergency Shipbuilding Program. After the war the shipyard closed in February 1946. The company went on to build many buildings and bridges until it was sold on March 26, 2007, to Perry-McCall Construction, Inc.

Background
The Auchter Company did design and engineering work for both on-site construction and pre-construction pieces shipped worldwide. It built office buildings, factories, bridges, warehouses, resorts, churches, museums, residential projects, hospitals, and power generating stations. The company built Jacksonville International Airport, military bases, courthouses, and jails. To support World War II, it built floating repair drydocks for the US Navy. The privately owned company was founded by George David Auchter in 1929. He later sold the company to the Glass family. Dave Auchter, one of the founder's grandsons, later became a company executive.

Before moving to Jacksonville, Florida, George D. Auchter was from Red Bank, New Jersey. A trained engineer, Auchter came to work on a bridge project in the mid-1920s for a New Jersey employer. He received a Florida engineering license in 1922, and initially constructed bridges and overpasses. For the war effort built pulpwood barges, floating repair drydocks, and concrete ships. After the war, he continued in civil construction and high-rise projects. Wishing to retire, Auchter sold the company to an investor group in 1981.

One of the investors was Wilbur H. Glass Jr., whose father Wilbur H Glass Sr had been President of the Auchter Company for 14 years. Glass Jr also had a civil engineering degree, having joined the US Army as a field engineer in 1957. He worked at the Auchter Company, initially as a project manager and became a vice president in 1979. Glass bought out the other investors in 1993, and kept the Auchter Company name.  The company continued its tradition of building Jacksonville's major works and expanded to other Florida locations. Glass also moved the company into retail service, such as Gate Petroleum convenience stores and three big-box Target stores in the North Florida area.

In 1999, the Auchter Company moved its headquarters to a First Coast Technology Park on the University of North Florida's campus. The new 3.36 acre headquarters helped build the company's relationship with the university. Glass's son, Brad Glass earned a degree in business administration from the University of North Florida and joined The Auchter Company in 1995. Jeff Glass, Wilbur's other son, started with the company in 1978. In 1993 Wilbur made both of his sons partners in ownership. Jeff retired in 2004 and Brad later went on to become president.

In 2000, another of George Auchter's grandsons, Dave Auchter, became Director of Corporate Development after working as media director for World Golf Village and the National Football League's Jacksonville Jaguars. The Auchter Company continued as engineering construction contractors until 2007. Perry-Mccall Construction Inc. purchased the Auchter Company on March 26, 2007.

Construction work
The employee-owned company's 1,500 completed projects in 45 years span the Western Hemisphere.

Jacksonville City Hall, (1960) now the Courthouse Annex Building 
Crane Company Building (1928)
Old Palm Valley Bridge in St. Johns County (1937)
Modis Building (1974) (was the Independent Life Building)
Jacksonville Landing (1987) (now demolished)
Humana Building (1985)
Riverplace Tower (1967) (was the Gulf Life Tower)
BellSouth Tower Jacksonville, now TIAA Bank Center (1982)
SunTrust International Center (1974)
Western Union Telegraph buildings (1931) now the Museum of Contemporary Art Jacksonville
EverBank Center (1998)
Parts of the Naval Air Station Jacksonville
Parts of the Naval Station Mayport (1941-1943) 
Navy's Mayport officers' quarters by the St. Johns River
Merrill-Stevens Drydock & Repair Co. 
St. Regis Paper Company Factory
Maxwell House Coffee Plant
Anheuser Busch Yeast Plant
Two Prudential Plaza (1985)
Ponte Vedra Inn and Club
Amelia Island Plantation
Jacksonville Port Authority Wharf 
Parts of the Jacksonville's St. Vincent's Medical Center
Century Tower (University of Florida)(1953) and Gym and another building
Old Duval County Courthouse (1958) 
Jacksonville International Airport (1965)
Jacksonville Civic Auditorium (1962)
Baptist Health Center Downtown)
First Baptist Church of Jacksonville (1993)
Old Jacksonville Public Library downtown
Jacksonville's Hendricks Avenue Overpass
Haines Street Expressway
Beach Boulevard Intercostal Waterway Bridge in Jacksonville Beach
Amelia Island River Bridge in Fernandina
Vilano Bridge in St. Augustine.

Ships built

Small Auxiliary Floating Dry Docks (AFD - AFDL)

The Auchter Company built Auxiliary Floating Docks, Light (AFDL) for the US Navy. They were also called Auxiliary Floating Docks (AFD). AFD were 288 ft long, had a beam of 64 ft (20 m), and draft of 3 ft 3 in empty and 31 ft 4 in (9.55 m) flooded to load a ship. A normal crew was 60 men. AFDL displaced 1,200 tons and could lift 1,900 tons to take a ship out the water for repair. AFDL were built as one piece, open at both ends. AFDLs has a crew of 30 to 130 men, living in a barge alongside the AFDL. Used to repair small crafts, PT boats and small submarines, all AFD were reclassified AFDL after the war in 1946.

    USS AFD-19 - AFDL-19 served in Dunstaffnage a Scottish village, sold and moved to Jacksonville, Florida
    USS AFD-20 - AFDL-20 served American Samoa
    USS AFD-21 - AFDL-21
    USS AFD-22 - AFDL-22
    USS Adept (AFD-23) - AFDL-23

References

Companies based in Jacksonville, Florida
Privately held companies based in Florida
Construction and civil engineering companies of the United States
Construction and civil engineering companies established in 1929
Architecture firms based in Jacksonville
1929 establishments in Florida